Queen Elizabeth Range may refer to:

 Queen Elizabeth Range (Antarctica)
 Queen Elizabeth Ranges in Canada